Marmagne is a commune in the Cher department in the Centre-Val de Loire region of France.

Geography
The A71 autoroute cuts across the middle of the commune’s territory, which is also served by a TER railway.

Population

Sights
 The church of St. Denis, dating from the thirteenth century.
 Several seventeenth-century buildings.
 The seventeenth-century chateau of Marmagne.
 The thirteenth-century abbey at Beauvoir.

See also
Communes of the Cher department

References

Communes of Cher (department)